Nordmaling Municipality is a municipality in Västerbotten County in northern Sweden. Its seat is located in Nordmaling.

History
The municipal system in Sweden was introduced in 1863 and Nordmaling Municipality was one of the entities created out of a parish. In 1914 a part of the municipality was detached. The subdivision reforms of 1952 and 1971 did not affect the municipality.

Localities
There are three localities (or urban areas) in Nordmaling Municipality:

The municipal seat in bold

References

External links

Nordmaling Municipality - Official site

Municipalities of Västerbotten County